"The Vows Go Unbroken (Always True to You)" is a song written by Gary Burr and Eric Kaz, and recorded by American country music artist Kenny Rogers. It was released in August 1989 as the third single from the album Something Inside So Strong. 

The song reached number 8 on the Billboard Hot Country Singles & Tracks chart.

Chart performance

References

Kenny Rogers songs
1989 songs
1989 singles
Songs written by Gary Burr
Songs written by Eric Kaz
Reprise Records singles
Song recordings produced by Jim Ed Norman